Rona is situated beside the river Gelgia, the village consists of three parts, the old lower village (Rona), the upper village (Ruegna) and the new lower village (Rieven).
There is a church in the upper village and two pubs/restaurants in the old lower village.

The valley in which the village lies was chosen as the site of a hydroelectric dam but, following local protest, the village was spared and the dam moved upstream to Mamorera.

Surses
Former municipalities of Graubünden
Villages in Graubünden